Shelley O'Donnell  is a former Australia netball international. Between 1990 and 1999, O'Donnell made 84 senior appearances for Australia. She was a member of the Australia teams that won gold medals at the 1991, 1995 and 1999 World Netball Championships, the 1993 World Games and the 1998 Commonwealth Games. During the Esso/Mobil Superleague era, O'Donnell played for several teams, including the Australian Institute of Sport and Contax. Between 1997 and 2005, O'Donnell played for Melbourne Kestrels in the Commonwealth Bank Trophy league. In 1992, she was awarded the Medal of the Order of Australia.

Early life and family
Shelley O'Donnell is the daughter of Bev and Graeme O'Donnell. The O'Donnell family is from Ringwood North, Victoria. She is a member of a prominent Australian rules football family. O'Donnell's paternal grandmother, Eileen O'Donnell (née Rankin) was the daughter of Teddy Rankin and the sister of Bert, Cliff and Doug Rankin. All four were prominent players with Geelong. Her father and brother, Gary O'Donnell were also notable players. Her sister, Wendy O'Donnell, is also a netball player. In 2019 O'Donnell's daughter, Hannah Mundy, was selected to play for Victorian Fury.

Playing career

Esso/Mobil Superleague
During the Esso/Mobil Superleague era, O'Donnell and her sister Wendy played together for several teams. In 1987, together with Shelley Oates-Wilding, they were both members of the Australian Institute of Sport team that were grand finalists. In 1989, together with Nicole Richardson, they played for Melbourne/Doncaster Keas. In 1990 they played for Melbourne City, a composite team coached by Norma Plummer and also featuring Roselee Jencke and Simone McKinnis. Melbourne City finished as champions after defeating Contax 52–42 in the grand final. In 1993, alongside Kathryn Harby and Julie Nykiel, she played for Contax as an "import player". In 1994 she captained Melbourne Keas while Nicole Richardson served as vice-captain. In 1996 she captained the AIS team after returning as an "import player".

Melbourne Kestrels
Between 1997 and 2005, O'Donnell played for Melbourne Kestrels in the Commonwealth Bank Trophy league. She was the inaugural Kestrels captain and continued in the role until 2000. She missed the 2001 and 2002 seasons after giving birth to her daughter, Hannah. She returned in 2003, but then missed the 2004 season after giving birth to her son, Jasper. She then made a second comeback in 2005 and played her final senior netball season.

Australia
Between 1990 and 1999, O'Donnell made 84 senior appearances for Australia. O'Donnell previously represented Australia at under-21 level, including at the 1988 World Youth Netball Championships, when her teammates included her sister, Wendy. She made her senior debut on 21 November 1990. She was subsequently a member of the Australia teams that won gold medals at the 1991, 1995 and 1999 World Netball Championships, the 1993 World Games and the 1998 Commonwealth Games. O'Donnell was vice-captain of the 1999 World Netball Championship squad and announced her retirement from international netball following their title win. In 1992 O'Donnell, along with the rest of the gold medal-winning 1991 World Netball Championship squad, were awarded the Medal of the Order of Australia. In 2010, O'Donnell was inducted into the Australian Netball Hall of Fame.

Coach and commentator
Since retiring as a netball player, O'Donnell has remained involved in the game, both as a commentator with ABC and as a coach. In 2017 and 2018 she coached the Eastern Football Netball League inter-league team.

Honours
Australia
World Netball Championships
Winners: 1991, 1995, 1999
Commonwealth Games
Winners: 1998
World Games
Winners: 1993
Melbourne City
Esso Super League
Winners: 1990
Australian Institute of Sport
Esso Super League
Runners up: 1987

References

1967 births
Living people
Australian netball players
Australia international netball players
Netball players at the 1998 Commonwealth Games
Commonwealth Games gold medallists for Australia
Commonwealth Games medallists in netball
Netball players at the 1993 World Games
Netball players from Victoria (Australia)
Australian Institute of Sport netball players
Contax Netball Club players
Melbourne Kestrels players
Esso/Mobil Superleague players
Australian netball coaches
Australian netball commentators
Rankin family of Geelong
Recipients of the Medal of the Order of Australia
1991 World Netball Championships players
1995 World Netball Championships players
1999 World Netball Championships players
People from Ringwood, Victoria
Medallists at the 1998 Commonwealth Games